{{Infobox election
| election_name     = 2004 United States Senate election in Nevada
| country           = Nevada
| type              = Presidential
| ongoing           = no
| previous_election = 1998 United States Senate election in Nevada
| previous_year     = 1998
| next_election     = 2010 United States Senate election in Nevada
| next_year         = 2010
| election_date     = November 2, 2004

| image1            = 
| nominee1          = Harry Reid
| party1            = Democratic Party (United States)
| popular_vote1     = 494,805
| percentage1       = 61.0%

| image2            = 
| nominee2          = Richard Ziser
| party2            = Republican Party (United States)
| popular_vote2     = 284,640
| percentage2       = 35.1%

| map_image         = 2004 United States Senate election in Nevada results map by county.svg
| map_size          = 230px
| map_caption       = County resultsReid:   Ziser:  
| title             = U.S. Senator
| before_election   = Harry Reid
| before_party      = Democratic Party (United States)
| after_election    = Harry Reid
| after_party       = Democratic Party (United States)
}}

The 2004 United States Senate election in Nevada''' was held on November 2, 2004. Incumbent Democratic U.S. Senator Harry Reid, the Senate Minority Whip, won re-election to a fourth term.

Republican primary

Candidates 
 Richard Ziser, anti-gay marriage activist
 Kenneth A. Wegner, U.S. Army veteran
 Robert Brown
 Royle Melton
 Cherie Tilley, businessman
 Carlo Poliak, perennial candidate

Results

General election

Candidates 
 Thomas Hurst (L)
 Gary Marinch (NL)
 Harry Reid (D), incumbent U.S. Senator
 David Schumann (I)
 Richard Ziser (R), conservative activist

Predictions

Results

See also 
 2004 United States Senate elections

References 

2004 Nevada elections
Nevada
2000